Pine Tree is a community in the Canadian province of Nova Scotia, located  in Pictou County.

References
Pine Tree entry in Nova Scotia Geographical Names (Department of Service Nova Scotia & Municipal Relations)

Communities in Pictou County
General Service Areas in Nova Scotia